The 1951 Pittsburgh Steelers season was the franchise's 19th in the National Football League.

Regular season

Schedule

Game summaries

Week 1 (Monday October 1, 1951): New York Giants 

at Forbes Field, Pittsburgh, Pennsylvania

 Game time: 
 Game weather: 
 Game attendance: 27,984
 Referee: 
 TV announcers: 

Scoring drives:

 Pittsburgh – FG Geri 31
 New York Giants – FG Poole 11
 New York Giants – Scott 56 pass from Tidwell (Poole kick)
 Pittsburgh – Geri 1 run (Geri kick)
 Pittsburgh – FG Geri 26
 New York Giants – FG Poole 21

Week 2 (Sunday October 7, 1951): Green Bay Packers  

at City Stadium, Green Bay, Wisconsin

 Game time: 
 Game weather: 
 Game attendance: 8,324
 Referee: 
 TV announcers: 

Scoring drives:

 Green Bay – Grimes 18 run (Cone kick)
 Green Bay – Mann 40 pass from Rote (Cone kick)
 Green Bay – Pelfrey 20 pass from Thomason (Cone kick)
 Green Bay – Rote 1 run (Cone kick)
 Pittsburgh – Chandnois 33 pass from Ortmann (Geri kick)
 Pittsburgh – Chandnois 2 run (Geri kick)
 Pittsburgh – Rogel 1 run (Geri kick)
 Pittsburgh – Safety, Cloud tackled by Mehelich in end zone
 Pittsburgh – Finks 25 interception (Geri kick)
 Pittsburgh – FG Geri 26
 Green Bay – Mann 16 pass from Rote (Cone kick)

Week 3 (Sunday October 14, 1951): San Francisco 49ers  

at Forbes Field, Pittsburgh, Pennsylvania

 Game time: 
 Game weather: 
 Game attendance: 27,307
 Referee: 
 TV announcers: 

'Scoring drives:

 San Francisco – Cason 65 interception (Soltau kick)
 Pittsburgh – Nickel 77 pass from Geri (Geri kick)
 Pittsburgh – FG Geri 16
 San Francisco – Monachino 7 run (Soltau kick)
 San Francisco – Perry 4 pass from Albert (Soltau kick)
 San Francisco – Schabarum 8 run (Soltau kick)
 Pittsburgh – Chandnois 8 pass from Mathews (Geri kick)
 Pittsburgh – Nickel 22 pass from Mathews (Geri kick)

Week 4 (Sunday October 21, 1951): Cleveland Browns  

at Cleveland Municipal Stadium, Cleveland, Ohio

 Game time: 
 Game weather: 
 Game attendance: 32,409
 Referee: 
 TV announcers: 

Scoring drives:

 Cleveland – Gillom 38 fumble run (Groza kick)
 Cleveland – FG Groza 25
 Cleveland – Lahr 27 interception (Groza kick)

Week 5 (Sunday October 28, 1951): Chicago Cardinals  

at Comiskey Park, Chicago, Illinois

 Game time: 
 Game weather: 
 Game attendance: 14,773
 Referee: 
 TV announcers: 

Scoring drives:

 Pittsburgh – Jansante 46 pass from Geri (Geri kick)
 Chicago Cardinals – Cross 1 run (Patton kick)
 Chicago Cardinals – Cross 7 run (Patton kick)
 Pittsburgh – Geri 49 pass from Chandnois (Geri kick)
 Pittsburgh – Nickel 33 pass from Ortmann (Geri kick)
 Pittsburgh – Butler 52 interception (Geri run)

Week 6 (Sunday November 4, 1951): Philadelphia Eagles  

at Forbes Field, Pittsburgh, Pennsylvania

 Game time: 
 Game weather: 
 Game attendance: 19,649
 Referee: 
 TV announcers: 

Scoring Drives:

 Pittsburgh – FG Geri 22
 Pittsburgh – Shipkey 20 interception (Geri kick)
 Philadelphia – Walston 26 pass from Burk (Waltson kick)
 Philadelphia – Pihos 12 pass from Burk (Walston kick)
 Pittsburgh – FG Geri 40
 Philadelphia – S. Van Buren 2 run (kick failed)
 Philadelphia – Cowhig 25 fumble run (Walston kick)
 Philadelphia – Sandifer 30 pass from Burk (Walston kick)

Week 7 (Sunday November 11, 1951): Green Bay Packers  

at Forbes Field, Pittsburgh, Pennsylvania

 Game time: 
 Game weather: 
 Game attendance: 20,080
 Referee: 
 TV announcers: 

Scoring drives:

 Pittsburgh – Chandnois 13 run (Geri kick)
 Pittsburgh – Nuzum 3 run (Geri kick)
 Pittsburgh – Geri 3 run (Geri kick)
 Pittsburgh – Minarik 35 pass from Chandnois (Geri kick)
 Green Bay – Mann 20 pass from Rote (Cone kick)

Week 8 (Sunday November 18, 1951): Washington Redskins  

at Forbes Field, Pittsburgh, Pennsylvania

 Game time: 
 Game weather: 
 Game attendance: 15,060 
 Referee: 
 TV announcers: 

Scoring drives:

 Washington – Goode 2 run (kick blocked)
 Pittsburgh – Mathews 68 punt return (Geri kick)
 Washington – FG Dudley 30
 Washington – FG Dudley 37
 Washington – FG Dudley 37
 Washington – Goode 10 run (Dudley kick)

Week 9 (Sunday November 25, 1951): Philadelphia Eagles  

at Shibe Park, Philadelphia, Pennsylvania

 Game time: 
 Game weather: 
 Game attendance: 15,537
 Referee: 
 TV announcers: 

Scoring drives:

 Pittsburgh – FG Geri 24
 Pittsburgh – Rogel 1 run (Geri kick)
 Philadelphia – Pihos 16 pass from Burk (kick blocked)
 Pittsburgh – Chandnois 37 pass from Ortmann (Geri kick)
 Philadelphia – Parmer 15 run (Walston kick)

Week 10 (Sunday December 2, 1951): New York Giants  

at Polo Grounds, New York, New York

 Game time: 
 Game weather: 
 Game attendance: 19,196
 Referee: 
 TV announcers: 

Scoring drives:

 New York Giants – Landry 9 fumble run (Poole kick)
 New York Giants – Schnellbacher 46 interception (Poole kick)

Week 11 (Sunday December 9, 1951): Cleveland Browns  

at Forbes Field, Pittsburgh, Pennsylvania

 Game time: 
 Game weather: 
 Game attendance: 24,229
 Referee: 
 TV announcers: 

Scoring drives:

 Cleveland – Carpenter 24 run (Groza kick)
 Cleveland – Motley 8 run (Groza kick)
 Cleveland – Lavelli 7 pass from Graham (Groza kick)
 Cleveland – Taseff 3 run (Groza kick)

Week 13 (Sunday December 16, 1951): Washington Redskins  

at Griffith Stadium, Washington, DC

 Game time: 
 Game weather: 
 Game attendance: 18,969
 Referee: 
 TV announcers: 

Scoring drives:

 Washington – FG Dudley 15
 Washington – Tereshinski 16 pass from Baugh (Dudley kick)
 Pittsburgh – Chandnois 40 pass from Finks (Geri kick)
 Pittsburgh – Rogel 3 run (Geri kick)
 Pittsburgh – Geri 4 run (kick failed)

Standings

References

Pittsburgh Steelers seasons
Pittsburgh Steelers
Pitts